Half Ticket may refer to:
 Half Ticket (1962 film), an Indian Hindi-language comedy film
 Half Ticket (2016 film), an Indian Marathi-language film